The men's decathlon event at the 2015 African Games was held on 13–14 September.

Medalists

Results

100 metres
Wind: -0.1 m/s

Long jump

Shot put

High jump

400 metres

110 metres hurdles
Wind: +0.1 m/s

Discus throw

Pole vault

Javelin throw

1500 metres

Final standings

References

Decathlon